Litsea hirsutissima is a species of plant in the family Lauraceae. It is endemic to Peninsular Malaysia. It is threatened by habitat loss.

References

hirsutissima
Endemic flora of Peninsular Malaysia
Trees of Peninsular Malaysia
Conservation dependent plants
Taxonomy articles created by Polbot